Hocker may refer to:disambiguation from  old German perhaps. Also, an old figure such as the "rune."

People
 Gero Clemens Hocker (born 1975), German politician
 Karl-Friedrich Höcker (1911–2000), German Nazi SS concentration camp officer and war criminal
 Willie Kavanaugh Hocker (1862–1944), American schoolteacher and designer of the current Arkansas flag

Places
 Colonia Hocker, a village and municipality in Entre Ríos Province, Argentina

See also
Höcker